Leporinus octofasciatus is a species of Leporinus widely found in the northern Cubatão River in Santa Catarina and the upper Paraná River basin in Brazil in South America. This species can reach a length of  SL.

References

Géry, J., 1977. Characoids of the world. Neptune City ; Reigate : T.F.H. [etc.]; 672 p. : ill. (chiefly col.) ; 23 cm.

Taxa named by Franz Steindachner
Fish described in 1915
Anostomidae
Freshwater fish of Brazil